Bundespolizeidirektion 11 or BPOLD 11 is the unified command of the units with special tasks of the German Federal Police.

History
Following the September 11 attacks in 2001 the then Federal Border Guard of Germany developed its first plans for a Special Forces Directorate which was further developed after the 2004 Madrid train bombings and the 7 July 2005 London bombings. Following further terrorist attacks in central Europe, including Germany, the establishment of the Federal Police Directorate 11 was decided amond other measures which were aimed on strengthening the German Police forces. 
Personnel was drawn from various agencies in Germany tasked with policing or intelligence tasks, such as the Federal Criminal Police Office, or the Federal Office for the Protection of the Constitution.

Organization and tasks
The Directorate 11 was established on August 1, 2017 in order to improve the coordination among all specialised units of the Federal Police. This encompasses all units who are tasked with dealing with terrorist threats, organised crime and complex large scale attacks.

 GSG9
 Federal Police Air Service
 PSA BPOL
 Special Protection Tasks Aviation (sky marshals)
 Federal Police Operation and Investigation Support

The German police's centers for research and development in the field of explosive ordnance disposal and IED disposal and the use of unmanned aerial vehicles are also subordinate to the Directorate 11.

The Directorate 11 is headed by Olaf Lindner, former commander of the GSG9.

Notable operations
 Support of FRONTEX's border guard operations between Spain and Morocco, Greece and Turkey.

References

Further reading 
 Sören Sünkler: Bundespolizeidirektion 11 - "Team of Teams". In: Kommando-International Special Operations Magazine, Nr. 2/2019 März/April, ISSN 2196-1204, p. 24-25.

External links
 Official site
 Official presentation

Non-military counterterrorist organizations
Organisations based in Berlin 
Specialist law enforcement agencies of Germany